Katariina (Finnish; Katarina in Swedish) is a district in the Uittamo-Skanssi ward of the city of Turku, in Finland. It is located in the south of the city, and is mainly a low-density residential suburb. There is also a nature reserve in the area.

The current population of Katariina is 1,282, and it is increasing at an annual rate of 5.38%. 23.63% of the district's population are under 15 years old, while 8.50% are over 65. The district's linguistic makeup is 91.73% Finnish, 5.15% Swedish, and 3.12% other.

See also
 Districts of Turku
 Districts of Turku by population

Districts of Turku